Money: A Suicide Note is a 1984 novel by Martin Amis. In 2005, Time included the novel in its "100 best English-language novels from 1923 to the present". The novel is based on Amis's experience as a script writer on the feature film Saturn 3, a Kirk Douglas vehicle. The novel was dramatised by the BBC in 2010.

Plot summary
Money tells the story of, and is narrated by, John Self, a successful director of adverts who is invited to New York City by Fielding Goodney, a film producer, to shoot his first film. Self is an archetypal hedonist and slob; he is usually drunk, an avid consumer of pornography and prostitutes, eats too much and, above all, spends too much, encouraged by Goodney.

The actors in the film, which Self originally titles Good Money but which he eventually wants to rename Bad Money, all have some kind of emotional issue which clashes with fellow cast members and with their roles — the principal casting having already been done by Goodney. As examples: the strict Christian Spunk Davis (whose name is intentionally unfortunate) is asked to play a drugs pusher; the ageing hardman Lorne Guyland has to be physically assaulted; the motherly Caduta Massi, who is insecure about her body, is asked to appear in a sex scene with Lorne, whom she detests.

While in New York, Self is stalked by "Frank the Phone", a menacing misfit who threatens him over a series of telephone conversations, apparently because Self personifies the success Frank was unable to attain. Self is not frightened of Frank, even when he is beaten by him while on an alcoholic bender. (Self, characteristically, is unable to remember how he was attacked.) Towards the end of the book Self arranges to meet Frank for a showdown, which is the beginning of the novel's shocking denouement. Money is similar to Amis's five-years-later London Fields in having a major plot twist.

Self returns to London before filming begins, revealing more of his humble origins, his landlord father Barry (who makes his contempt for his son clear by invoicing him for every penny spent on his upbringing) and pub doorman Fat Vince. Self discovers that his London girlfriend, Selina, is having an affair with Ossie Twain, while Self is likewise attracted to Twain's wife in New York, Martina. This increases Self's psychosis and makes his final downfall even more brutal.

After Selina carries out a plot to destroy any chance of a relationship between him and Martina, Self discovers that all his credit cards have been blocked, and, after confronting Frank, the stars of the film angrily claim that there is no film. It is revealed that Goodney had been manipulating him; all the contracts signed by Self were loans and debts, and Goodney fabricated the entire film. He is also revealed to be Frank. He supposedly chose Self for his behaviour on the first plane to America, where Goodney was sitting close to him. Felix, a bellhop, helps Self escape the angry mob in the hotel lobby and fly back to England, only to discover that Barry is not his real father.

Amis writes himself into the novel as a kind of overseer and confidant in Self's final breakdown. He is an arrogant character, but Self is not afraid to express his rather low opinion of Amis, such as the fact that he earns so much yet "lives like a student". Amis, among others, tries to warn Self that he is heading for destruction, but to no avail. Felix becomes Self's only real friend in America and finally makes Self realise how much trouble he has: "Man, you are out for a whole lot of money."

The novel's subtitle, "A Suicide Note", is clarified at the end of the novel. It is revealed that Barry Self is not John Self's father; his father is in fact Fat Vince. As such, John Self no longer exists. Hence, in the subtitle, Amis indicates that this cessation of John Self's existence is analogous to suicide, which, of course, results in the death of the self. A Suicide Note could also relate to the novel as a whole, or money, which Self himself calls "suicide notes" within the novel.

After learning that his father is Fat Vince, John realises that his true identity is that of Fat John, half-brother of Fat Paul. The novel ends with Fat John having lost all his money (if it ever existed), yet he is still able to laugh at himself and is cautiously optimistic about his future.

Background
The novel is derived in part from Amis's experience working on the film Saturn 3, of which he was scriptwriter. The character of Lorne Guyland was based on the star of the film, Kirk Douglas. His name is a play on the manner in which Long Island - where the character resides - is pronounced in certain New York-area accents. Amis said of his work "Money makes a break from the English tradition of sending a foreigner abroad in that (a) John Self is half American, and (b) as a consequence cannot be scandalized by America. You know the usual Pooterish Englishman who goes abroad in English novels and is taken aback by everything. Well, not a bit of that in John Self. He completely accepts America on its own terms and is perfectly at home with it."

Reception
In 2010, David Lipsky, in Time, called Amis's book "the best celebrity novel I know: the stars who demand and wheedle their way across his plot seem less like caricature and more like photorealism every year."

2010 BBC television adaptation
On 11 November 2009, The Guardian reported that the BBC had adapted Money for television as part of their early 2010 schedule for BBC 2. The series was shown in May 2010. Actor Nick Frost played John Self, and Vincent Kartheiser portrayed Fielding Goodney. Emma Pierson played Selina Street, and Jerry Hall played Caduta Massi. The adaptation, written by Tom Butterworth and Chris Hurford, and directed by Jeremy Lovering, is in two parts.

Footnotes

Further reading

External links
Martin Amis discusses Money on the BBC World Book Club
Brian Finney's alternative interpretation of the novel's subtitle
Veronica Geng's review in The New York Times, 24 March 1985 (pdf file)
BOMB Magazine interview with Martin Amis by Patrick McGrath (winter 1987)

1984 British novels
Novels by Martin Amis
Metafictional novels
Fiction with unreliable narrators
Postmodern novels
Novels set in New York City
Jonathan Cape books
British novels adapted into television shows